The San Joaquin Valley is the area of the Central Valley of the U.S. state of California that lies south of the Sacramento–San Joaquin River Delta and is drained by the San Joaquin River. It comprises seven counties of Northern and one of Southern California, including, in the north, all of San Joaquin and Kings counties, most of Stanislaus, Merced, and Fresno counties, and parts of Madera and Tulare counties, along with a majority of Kern County, in Southern California. Although the valley is predominantly rural, it has densely populated urban centers:  Fresno, Bakersfield, Stockton, Modesto, Tulare, Visalia, Hanford, and Merced.

The first European to enter the valley was Pedro Fages in 1772. The San Joaquin Valley was originally inhabited by the Yokuts and Miwok peoples.

The Tejon Indian Tribe of California is a federally recognized tribe of Kitanemuk, Yokuts, and Chumash indigenous people of California. Their ancestral homeland is the southern San Joaquin Valley, San Emigdio Mountains, and Tehachapi Mountains. Today they live in Kern County, California, headquartered in Wasco and Bakersfield, California.

The Picayune Rancheria of Chukchansi Indians of California is a federally recognized tribe of indigenous people of California, Chukchansi or Foothills Yokuts, now located in Madera County in the San Joaquin Valley. Since 2010, statewide droughts in California have further strained both the San Joaquin Valley's and the Sacramento Valley's water security.

Geography

The San Joaquin Valley extends from the Sacramento–San Joaquin River Delta in the north to the Tehachapi Mountains in the south, and from the various California coastal ranges (from the Diablo Range in the north to the Temblor Range in the south) in the west to the Sierra Nevada in the east. Unlike the Sacramento Valley, the river system for which the San Joaquin Valley is named does not extend very far along the valley. Most of the valley south of Fresno, instead, drains into Tulare Lake, which no longer exists continuously due to diversion of its sources. The valley's primary river is the San Joaquin, which drains north through about half of the valley into the Sacramento–San Joaquin River Delta. The Kings and Kern Rivers are in the southern endorheic basin of the valley, all of which have been largely diverted for agricultural uses and are mostly dry in their lower reaches.

Geological history
The San Joaquin Valley began to form about 66 million years ago during the early Paleocene era. Broad fluctuations in the sea level caused various areas of the valley to be flooded with ocean water for the next 60 million years. About 5 million years ago, the marine outlets began to close due to uplift of the coastal ranges and the deposition of sediment in the valley. Starting 2 million years ago, a series of glacial episodes periodically caused much of the valley to become a fresh water lake. Lake Corcoran was the last widespread lake to fill the valley about 700,000 years ago. At the beginning of the Holocene there were three major lakes remaining in the southern part of the Valley, Tulare Lake, Buena Vista Lake and Kern Lake. In the late 19th and in the 20th century, agricultural diversion of the Kern River eventually dried out these lakes. Today, only a fragment of Buena Vista Lake remains as two small lakes Lake Webb and Lake Evans in a portion of the former Buena Vista Lakebed.

Climate
The San Joaquin Valley has extremely hot, dry summers and pleasantly mild winters characterized by dense tule fog. Its rainy season normally runs from November through April. The valley has experienced a severe and intensifying megadrought since the early 2010s. This drought is not only affecting humans, with farmland  taking much of the impact, but also the wildlife  as well.

In August 2015, the Director of the California Department of Water Resources stated, "Because of increased pumping, groundwater levels are reaching record lows—up to 100 feet lower than previous records." 
The sinking has destroyed thousands of groundwater well casings and has the potential to damage aqueducts, roads, bridges, and flood-control structures. In the long term, the subsidence caused by extracting groundwater could irreversibly reduce the underground aquifer's water storage capacity, although immediate and short term needs are given higher priority and sense of urgency than long term sustainability.

The National Weather Service Forecast Office for the San Joaquin Valley is located in Hanford and includes a Doppler weather radar. Weather forecasts and climatological information for the San Joaquin Valley are available from its official website.

Demographics
The total population of the eight counties comprising the San Joaquin Valley at the time of the 2011-2015 American Community Survey 5-year Estimates by United States Census Bureau reported  a population of 4,080,509. The racial composition of San Joaquin Valley was 1,428,978 (35.0%) Non-Hispanic White, 2,048,280 (50.2%) Hispanic or Latino, 310,557 (7.6%) Asian, 193,694 (4.7%) Black or African American, 40,911 (1.0%) American Indian and Alaska Native, and 13,000 (0.32%) Native Hawaiian and other Pacific Islander.

The educational attainment of high school graduate or higher is 72.7%.

Poverty

According to the United States Census Bureau's American Community Survey, six San Joaquin Valley counties had the highest percentage of residents living below the federal poverty line in 2006 of any counties in California. The report also revealed that the same six counties were among the 52 counties with the highest poverty rate in the United States. The median income for a household in the valley was $46,713. The poverty rate for individuals below the poverty level is 23.7%.

Ethnic and cultural groups

Latinos/Hispanics, Chicanos and Mexicans

Currently, the Latino and Mexican descendants are large percentage of the demographics in the San Joaquin Valley. Since not long after the onset of the bracero program during World War II, all but a minor percentage of the farmworkers in the region have been of Mexican ancestry. Ethnic and economic friction between Mexican-Americans and the valley's predominantly white farming elite manifested itself most notably during the 1960s and 1970s, when the United Farm Workers, led by César Chávez, went on numerous strikes and called for boycotts of table grapes. The UFW generated enormous sympathy throughout the United States, even managing to terminate several agricultural mechanization projects at the United States Department of Agriculture. However, from the 1970s onward, landlords and large corporations have also hired undocumented immigrants. This has allowed them to increase their profits due to low overhead on wages.

European and Asian groups
The San Joaquin Valley has—by California standards—an unusually large number of European, Middle Eastern, and Asian ethnicities in the heritage of its citizens. These communities are often quite large and, relative to Americans immigration patterns, quite eclectic: for example, there are more Azorean Portuguese in the San Joaquin Valley than in the Azores. Many groups are found in majorities in specific cities, and hardly anywhere else in the region. For example, Assyrians are concentrated in Turlock, Dutch in Ripon, Sikhs in Stockton and Livingston, and Croats in Delano. Kingsburg is famous for its distinctly Swedish air, having been founded by immigrants from that country. Ethnic groups found in a broader area are Portuguese, Germans, Armenians, Basques, and the "Okies" of primarily English and Scots-Irish descent who migrated to California from the Midwest and South. Mennonite groups descended from Russian Germans settled in the areas of Reedley and Dinuba, as well as Protestant Volga Germans who settled in the broader Fresno area. Since the early 1970s East Indians of predominantly Punjabi, Gujrati and Southern India have settled in the valley communities. Most recently large numbers of Pakistanis have settled in Modesto and Lodi. In addition, the late 1970s and 80s saw an influx of immigrants from Indochina following the War in Vietnam. These immigrants, the majority of whom are Hmong, Thai, Laotian, Cambodian, and Vietnamese, have settled in the communities of Stockton, Modesto, Merced, and Fresno.

The Filipino American population is concentrated in Delano and Lathrop. Filipinos have a strong history in Stockton. Filipino organizations in Stockton are reflected in various commercial buildings identified as Filipino. Filipinos fought for the U.S. against Japan in WWII, in exchange for favorable immigration status. Stockton has been an adjunct to the San Francisco Bay Area, which was a major military production and transit area during WWII. Filipino emigration to Stockton followed.

These cultures are often the result of established ethnic communities and groups of immigrants coming to the United States at once. This is in part due to the founding of religious communes in the San Joaquin Valley: for example, the first permanent Sikh Gurdwara was founded in Stockton in 1915.

African Americans
Colonel Allensworth State Historic Park marks the location of the only California town to be founded, financed and governed by African Americans. The small farming community was founded in 1908 by Lt. Colonel Allen Allensworth, Professor William Payne, William Peck, a minister, John W. Palmer, a miner, and Harry A. Mitchell, a real estate agent, dedicated to improving the economic and social status of African Americans. Uncontrollable circumstances, including a drop in the area's water table, resulted in the town's demise. The "Allensworth Historic District" is listed on the National Register of Historic Places. The park is in Allensworth, California, an unincorporated area in Tulare County.

Okies and Arkies
The Depression-era migrants to the San Joaquin Valley from the South and Midwest are one of the more well-known groups in the Central Valley, in large part due to the popularity of John Steinbeck's novel The Grapes of Wrath and the Henry Fonda movie made from it. By 1910, agriculture in the southern Great Plains had become nearly unviable due to soil erosion and poor rainfall. Much of the rural population of states such as Kansas, Texas, Oklahoma, and Arkansas left at this time, selling their land and moving to Chicago, Kansas City, Detroit, and fast-growing Los Angeles. Those who remained experienced continuing deterioration of conditions, which reached their nadir during the drought that began in the late 1920s and created the infamous Dust Bowl. (Small cotton farmers in states such as Mississippi and Alabama suffered similar problems from the first major infestation of the boll weevil.) When the onset of the Great Depression created a national banking crisis, family farmers—usually heavily in debt—often had their mortgages foreclosed by banks desperate to shore up their balance sheets. In response, many farmers loaded their families and portable possessions into their automobiles and drove west.

Taking Route 66 to Barstow or Los Angeles and crossing the Tehachapi or Tejon passes, they began new lives as fruit and vegetable pickers on truck farms in the San Joaquin Valley. Having gone from the relative independence of homesteading to a condition that was essentially peasantry, many of them lived in squalid agricultural camps and were deeply unhappy with their economic plight; domestic disputes, crime, and suicide were rampant, and occasional riots broke out. New Deal measures alleviated some of these problems, albeit belatedly: by the time that The Grapes of Wrath drew public attention to the Okies' plight, many of them had already left the valley. Those who didn't were gradually assimilated into California culture and society where many of them and their descendants became noted artists, tradesmen, educators, legislators and professional business people, and their influence remains strong in many parts of the Valley today, especially in the south near Bakersfield.

Many of the Okies and Arkies left the San Joaquin Valley during World War II, most of them going to Los Angeles, San Francisco and San Diego to work in war-related industries. Many of those who stayed ended up in Bakersfield and Oildale, as the southern San Joaquin Valley became an important area of oil production after major Southern California oil fields such as Signal Hill began to dry up. Country music legends Buck Owens and Merle Haggard came out of Bakersfield's honky-tonk scene and created a hard-driving sound that is still deeply associated with the city.

Economy

Agriculture

The San Joaquin Valley produces 12.8% of California's agricultural production (as measured by dollar value). Grapes—table, raisin, wines, cotton, nuts (especially almonds and pistachios), citrus, and vegetables. Walnuts, oranges, peaches, garlic, tangerines, tomatoes, kiwis, hay, alfalfa and numerous other crops have been harvested with great success. Certain places are identified quite strongly with a given crop: Stockton produces the majority of the domestic asparagus consumed in the United States, and Fresno County is the largest producer of raisins.

Cattle and sheep ranching are also vitally important to the valley's economy. During the late 19th century and early 20th century, the Miller & Lux corporation built an agricultural monopoly centered around cattle. The corporation can be characterized as a precursor to corporate farming transforming the yeoman farmer into wage workers. The success of the business can be attributed to founder Henry Miller's direct management style which is reflected in his detailed correspondences to his subordinates. During recent years, dairy farming has greatly expanded in importance. As areas such as Chino and Corona have become absorbed into the suburban sprawl of Los Angeles, many dairy farmers have cashed out and moved their herds to Kings, Tulare, and Kern counties.

Between 1990 and 2004, 28,092 hectares (70,231 acres) of agricultural land was lost to urban development in the San Joaquin Valley. Although there have been some token efforts at confronting the problems of (sub)urban sprawl, the politically conservative climate of the Valley generally prefers traditional suburban sprawl type of growth such as low density housing and strip malls anchored by so-called big box stores and opposes measures such as "Smart Growth", "Transit Oriented Development", "High Density Housing", and increased public transit such as light and commuter rail. By August 2014, a three-year drought was prompting changes to the agriculture industry in the valley. Farmers began using complex irrigation systems and using treated waste water to feed crops, while many were switching from farming cotton to other commodities, chief among them, almonds.

Petroleum

California has long been one of the nation's most important oil-producing states, and the San Joaquin Valley has long since eclipsed the Los Angeles Basin as the state's primary oil production region. Scattered oil wells on small oil fields are found throughout the region, and several enormous extraction facilities – most notably near Lost Hills and Taft, including the enormous Midway-Sunset Oil Field, the third-largest oil field in the United States – are veritable forests of pumps.

Shell operated a major refinery in Bakersfield; it was sold in 2005 to Flying J, a Salt Lake-based firm that operates truck stops and refineries.  Flying J's bankruptcy in 2009 resulted in the refinery being shut down.

The oil and gas fields in Kern County are receiving increased attention since the July 2009 announcement by Occidental Petroleum of significant discovery of oil and gas reserves Even prior to this discovery the region retains more oil reserves than any other part of California.

Other major industries and employers
The isolation and vastness of the San Joaquin Valley, as well as its poverty and need for jobs, have led the state to build numerous prisons in the area. The most notable of these is Corcoran, whose inmates have included Charles Manson and Juan Corona. Other correctional facilities in the valley are at Avenal, Chowchilla, Tracy, Delano, Coalinga, and Wasco.

The only significant military base in the region is Naval Air Station Lemoore, a vast air base located  WSW of Hanford. Unlike many of California's other military installations, NAS Lemoore's operational importance has increased in the 1990s and 2000s. The other, Castle Air Force Base, located near Atwater was closed during the Base Realignment and Closure of the 1990s. Although both are in Kern County, Edwards Air Force Base and China Lake Naval Air Weapons Station are located in the High Desert area of that county.

Recent changes
The California real estate boom that began in the late 1990s has significantly changed the San Joaquin Valley. Once distinctly and fiercely independent of Los Angeles and San Francisco, the area has seen increasing exurban development as the cost of living forces young families and small businesses further and further away from the coastal urban cores. Stockton, Modesto, Tracy (as well as the nearby unincorporated community of Mountain House), Manteca, and Los Banos are increasingly dominated by commuters to San Francisco and Silicon Valley, and the small farming towns to the south are finding themselves in the Bay Area's orbit as well. Bakersfield, traditionally a boom-bust oil town once described by urban scholar Joel Kotkin as an "American Abu Dhabi," has seen a massive influx of former Los Angeles business owners and commuters, to the extent that gated communities containing million-dollar homes are going up on the city's outskirts. Wal-Mart, IKEA, Target, Amazon, CVS Pharmacy, Restoration Hardware, and other various large shipping firms have built huge distribution centers both in the southern end of the valley and northern part of the valley because of quick access to major interstates and low local wages.  Further integration with the rest of the state is likely to continue for the foreseeable future.

Educational institutions

University of California, Merced, Merced
California State University, Bakersfield, Bakersfield
California State University, Fresno, Fresno
California State University, Stanislaus, Turlock
Fresno Pacific University, Fresno
University of the Pacific, Stockton
Humphreys College, Stockton
Bakersfield College, Bakersfield
Clovis Community College, Clovis
Cerro Coso Community College, Kern County and surrounding areas
College of the Sequoias, Visalia
Fresno City College, Fresno
Madera Community College, Madera
Merced College, Merced
Modesto Junior College, Modesto
Porterville College, Porterville
Reedley College, Reedley
A.T. Still University, Porterville
San Joaquin College of Law, Clovis
San Joaquin Delta College, Stockton
Taft College, Taft
West Hills College Coalinga, Coalinga
West Hills College Lemoore, Lemoore

Infrastructure

Transportation

Roads

Interstate 5 (I-5) and State Route 99 (SR 99) each run nearly the entire length of the San Joaquin Valley. I-5 runs in the western part of the valley, bypassing the major population centers (including Fresno, currently the largest U.S. city without an Interstate highway), while SR 99 runs through them. Both highways then merge at the southern end of valley en route to Los Angeles. When the Interstate Highway System was created in the 1950s, the decision was made to build I-5 as an entirely then-new freeway bypass instead of upgrading the then-existing U.S. 99. Since then, state and federal representatives have pushed to convert SR 99 to an Interstate, although this cannot occur until all of the portions of SR 99 between I-5 and the U.S. 50 junction in Sacramento are upgraded to Interstate standards.

State Route 58 (SR 58), which is a freeway in Bakersfield and along most of its route until its terminus in Barstow, is an extremely important and very heavily traveled route for truckers from the valley and the Bay Area who want to cross the Sierra Nevada and leave California (by way of Interstate 15 or Interstate 40) without having to climb Donner Pass or brave the traffic congestion of Los Angeles. Proposals have also been made to designate this highway as a western extension of I-40 once the entirety of the route between Mojave and Barstow has been upgraded to a freeway. This would provide an Interstate connection for Bakersfield, currently the second-largest U.S. city without an Interstate. The most recent additions to this system are State Routes 168 and 180. Route 168 begins in Fresno on Route 180 linking to Huntington Lake in the mountains through Clovis and many smaller communities. This route is part of the California Freeway and Expressway System[2] and is eligible for the State Scenic Highway System[3]. State Route 180 is a state highway which runs through the heart of the San Joaquin Valley from Mendota through Fresno to Kings Canyon National Park. A short piece near the eastern end, through the Grant Grove section of Kings Canyon National Park, is not state-maintained. The part east of unbuilt State Route 65 near Minkler is eligible for the State Scenic Highway System; the road east of Dunlap is the Kings Canyon Scenic Byway, a Forest Service Byway.

Other important highways in the valley include State Route 46 (SR 46) and State Route 41 (SR 41), which respectively link the California Central Coast with Bakersfield and Fresno; State Route 33 (SR 33), which runs south to north along the valley's western rim and provides a connection to Ventura and Santa Barbara over the Santa Ynez Mountains; and State Route 152 (SR 152), an important commuter route linking Silicon Valley with its fast-growing exurbs such as Los Banos.

Rail
Amtrak San Joaquin service handles passenger traffic between Bakersfield and Stockton with extensions to either Sacramento or Oakland. Amtrak rail service does not continue south of Bakersfield, as the Union Pacific Railroad does not currently allow the San Joaquin trains to run on the highly congested rail route over Tehachapi Pass, which is the only route between Bakersfield and Los Angeles. Passengers between these towns must travel on Amtrak Thruway Motorcoach. The Coast Starlight passes nonstop through the San Joaquin Valley on extremely rare circumstances when detours are required due to trackwork on its normal trackage. The San Joaquin Valley is also the location of the planned initial operating segment of the California High-Speed Rail (CAHSR) project, which will run 171 miles from Bakersfield in the south to Merced in the north.

Freight service is provided by BNSF, UPRR and San Joaquin Valley Railroad.

Electricity 
The valley is served by the Western Area Power Administration. Western owns and operates its own equipment here and so performs its own weed management. Rotating and mixing herbicide modes of action are employed to preserve efficacy.

Public health

Air pollution 

Hemmed in by mountains and rarely having strong winds to disperse smog, the San Joaquin Valley has long suffered from some of the United States' worst air pollution. This pollution, exacerbated by stagnant weather, comes mainly from diesel and gasoline fueled vehicles and agricultural operations. Ammonium nitrate, which forms from the combination of vehicle nitrogen oxides (NOx) and ammonia gas contained in cow manure and urine, "accounts for more than half of the region’s PM2.5 on the area’s most polluted days."

Population growth has caused the San Joaquin Valley to rank with Los Angeles and Houston in most measures of air pollution. Only the Inland Empire region east of Los Angeles has worse overall air quality, and the San Joaquin Valley led the nation in 2004 in the number of days with quantities of ozone considered unhealthy by the Environmental Protection Agency. The San Joaquin Valley has been deemed an "extreme non-attainment zone" by the Environmental Protection Agency, meaning residents are exposed to air quality that is confirmed to be hazardous to human health.

Crop loss 
The region of the San Joaquin Valley has some of the richest soil that allows for the production of many crops.  Crops in this region include: grapes, oranges, cotton, vegetables and nuts. The plethora of crop land allows for the valley to benefit from the income of crop sales. About sixty percent of California's crops come from the land in this area.  However, the unhealthy air levels that arise from smog lead to the destruction of many crops. According to the California Air Resources Board the San Joaquin Valley loses about one billion dollars every year due to the pollution in the air destroying these crops.

Negative effects on public health 
The San Joaquin Valley suffers from extremely high ozone levels that tend to increase even more on hot days.  Kids are more inclined to play outdoors during summer when the weather is warmer. According to the United States Environmental Protection Agency this could lead to health issues such as asthma because these children are not fully developed yet.  The elderly population is also vulnerable to air pollution and could even suffer from heart attacks due to decreased lung functions.  Reports state that the residents in this community suffer from high rates of asthma and experience many related symptoms.

Nitrates in groundwater 
San Joaquin Valley, within the Central Valley of California, is made up of eight counties that are well known for agriculture. Overuse of nitrogen fertilizers and irrigated agriculture is common, and according to Thomas Harter, the chair for Water Resources Management and Policy at UC Davis, “more than 80 pounds of nitrogen per acre per year may leach into groundwater beneath irrigated lands, usually as nitrates”. Between the 1950s and 1980s, when nitrogen fertilizer use grew sixfold, nitrate concentrations in groundwater increased 2.5 times. Fertilizer runoffs contributes roughly 90% of all nitrate inputs to the alluvial groundwater system. Within agriculture, the two major factors are High-Intensity Crop Production and Large Dairy Herds. Because these communities are cut off from larger water distribution, they are dependent on wells, making groundwater a source of drinking water for 90% of San Joaquin Valley's residents.

Nitrates have found their way into the aquifers around the San Joaquin Valley, affecting over 250,000 people in communities that are poor and rural.  In 2006, the State Water Resources Board took samples from domestic wells in Tulare County; they found that 40% of 181 domestic wells had nitrate levels above the 10 mg/L legal limit. Though locals have typically used filters for their water, the filters need to be installed correctly and replaced frequently, which may not be economically feasible for the residents in Orosi. Table 2 on page 20 from Pacific Institute's "The Human Costs of Nitrate-contaminated Drinking Water in the San Joaquin Valley" indicates the water systems that were contaminated with nitrates over the legal limit, the percentage of the population affected that are non-white and that are below or near poverty-level, and the year since the violations began.

The Turlock Basin is a sub-basin of the San Joaquin Valley groundwater basin found within Stanislaus County and Merced County in the Central Valley. In California's Groundwater Bulletin 118, a chart, linked below, illustrates the number of non-compliant public supply wells with nitrates over the MCL. According to this chart, there were eight wells which had nitrate levels above the 10 mg/L MCL, out of 90 sampled for nitrates in 2006.

Nitrates are of concern because it interferes with the blood's ability to carry oxygen, and can have severe health effects on pregnant women, infants under 6 months, and children using tap water for their formula. Because nitrates interfere with blood's capacity to carry oxygen, infants are at high risk of death from blue-baby syndrome, which can occur when there are high nitrate levels in the blood that are untreated.

High-intensity crop production 
Within the past century, farmers have been increasing their production to meet high demand. To increase output and efficiency, farmers have increased the amount of fertilizers used, including nitrates. Because only a fraction of the nitrogen in fertilizers is efficiently used to help produce crops, this has led to a greater concentration of nitrates and phosphates in the waters, causing eutrophication and contamination of possible drinking water.

Large dairy herds 
Before the rapid rise in demand for meat products and dairy, roaming dairy herds had contributed an insignificant amount of nitrate pollution to the underlying groundwater systems. However, within the past few decades, the increasing amount of cattle has been one of the main contributors of nitrate contamination in the groundwater systems of California. Roughly around 1960, cattle were openly grazing pastures, and because of the large amount of lands which they roamed manure was not intensively managed. However, even though manure was not closely managed, "Nitrogen excretion and deposition in pastures likely did not exceed pasture buffering capacity and had no significant leaching to groundwater". Since the transition to dry-lot and free stall-based dairy farming in the mid-1970s, coupled with irrigated forage crops, dairy herds have contributed to nitrogen contamination.

Possible solutions and alternatives 
The large dairy herds create manure, which is used to create the fertilizers that is applied to the crop fields. As demand for crops increases, farmers look to lower the costs of production. Using manure-based fertilizers is cost effective since manure is a by-product of large dairy farms and herds. The alternative to manure, which contains a high level of nitrates, is composting. Composting however is relatively expensive compared to using manure as fertilizer, since it is not as effective and is more timely/costly to make because of the large amount of aeration needed.

San Joaquin Valley Fever 
San Joaquin Valley Fever, or coccidioidomycosis, is a fungal infection caused by Coccidioides immitis through the inhalation of airborne dust or dirt. The valley is just one of the areas in the southwestern United States where the illness is endemic due to C. immitis residing in the soil.

Cities and counties

Cities with more than 500,000 inhabitants
 Fresno

Cities with 100,000 to 500,000 inhabitants
 Bakersfield
 Clovis
 Modesto
 Stockton
 Visalia

Cities with 20,000 to 100,000 inhabitants

 Atwater
 Ceres
 Corcoran
 Delano
 Dinuba
 Hanford
 Lathrop
 Lemoore
 Lodi
 Los Banos
 Madera
 Manteca
 Merced
 Oakdale
 Patterson
 Porterville
 Reedley
 Riverbank
 Sanger
 Selma
 Shafter
 Tracy
 Tulare
 Turlock
 Wasco

Cities with fewer than 20,000 inhabitants

 Arvin
 Avenal
 Chowchilla
 Coalinga
 Dos Palos
 Escalon
 Exeter
 Farmersville
 Firebaugh
 Gustine
 Hughson
 Kerman
 Kettleman City
 Keyes
 Kingsburg
 Lindsay
 Livingston
 McFarland
 Mendota
 Newman
 Orange Cove
 Parlier
 Ripon
 San Joaquin
 Taft
 Waterford
 Woodlake

In popular culture
The San Joaquin Valley has been a major influence in American country, soul, nu metal, R&B, and hip hop music particularly through the  Bakersfield Sound, the Doowop Era, and  the Bakersfield Rap Scene, also referred to as Central California Hip Hop, Central Valley Hip Hop, or Central California Rap, which are all subgenres of Gangsta rap, Bass-Rap, West Coast G-funk, and West Coast Hip hop which are all different styles of West Coast Rap.  The Valley has been the home to many country, nu metal, and doo-wop musicians and singers, such as Buck Owens, Merle Haggard, Billy Mize, Korn, Red Simpson, Dennis Payne, The Maddox Brothers and Rose, The Paradons, The Colts, and  the Sons of the San Joaquin. The San Joaquin Valley is also home to many Indie Hip Hop labels, R&B singers, Jazz & Funk  musicians, and Hip Hop artist such as: Fashawn, Killa Tay, The Def Dames, Cali Agents,  Planet Asia. The Valley also has a strong literary tradition, heavy in poetry, producing many famous poets such as Sherley Anne Williams, and Gary Soto, current U.S. Poet Laureate Juan Felipe Herrera, and David St. John.

See also 

 Groundwater-related subsidence
 John Buttencourt Avila, "father of the sweet potato industry."
 List of California rivers
 Sacramento Valley
 San Joaquin (soil)
 Water in California

References

External links
Land of Risk/Land of Opportunity, UC Davis, November 2011

 
Valleys of California
Regions of California
San Joaquin River
Valleys of Fresno County, California
Valleys of Kern County, California
Valleys of Kings County, California
Valleys of Madera County, California
Valleys of Merced County, California
Valleys of San Joaquin County, California
Valleys of Stanislaus County, California
Valleys of Tulare County, California